Hedworth is a masculine given name and a surname. It may refer to:

 Hedworth Jolliffe, 2nd Baron Hylton (1829–1899), British Army officer and Member of Parliament
 Hedworth Lambton (MP) (1797–1876), Member of Parliament for North Durham (1832–1847)
 Hedworth Meux (1856–1929), born Hedworth Lambton, British Royal Navy Admiral of the Fleet
 Sir Hedworth Williamson, 7th Baronet (1797–1861), British politician 
 Sir Hedworth Williamson, 8th Baronet (1827–1900), British politician
 Chris Hedworth (born 1964), English retired footballer
 Henry Hedworth (1626–1705), English Unitarian writer

English masculine given names